Bhaluwa  is a former village development committee, now part of the municipality of Duhabi-Bhaluwa in Sunsari District in the Kosi Zone of south-eastern Nepal. At the time of the 1991 Nepal census it had a population of 3537 people living in 668 individual households.

References

Populated places in Sunsari District